This is a list of electoral division results for the Australian 1987 federal election in the state of Western Australia.

Overall results

Results by division

Brand

Canning

Cowan

Curtin

Forrest

Fremantle

Kalgoorlie

Moore

O'Connor

Perth

Stirling

Swan

Tangney

See also 
 Results of the 1987 Australian federal election (House of Representatives)
 Members of the Australian House of Representatives, 1987–1990

References 

Western Australia 1987